A fabric is a textile material, short for "textile fabric".

Fabric may also refer to:

Arts and Entertainment
Fabric (play), a play about human trafficking
Fabric (Cowell), a 1920 piano piece by Henry Cowell
Fabric (The Black Seeds album), 2017
"Fabric", a song by Dark Tranquillity from the 2000 album Haven
"Fabric", a song by Brockhampton from the 2018 album Iridescence
"Fabric" (Cupcakke song), from the 2018 album Eden

Computing
Fabric OS, a firmware for Brocade Communications Systems's Fibre Channel switches
Fabric.js, a Javascript HTML5 canvas library
Fabric computing, a consolidated high-performance computing platform
Switched fabric, a computer network topology where many devices connect with each other via switches

Other
Fabric (club), a nightclub in London, England
Fabric (geology), the spatial and geometric configuration of elements within a rock
 Fabric, Timișoara, a district of Timișoara, Romania

See also

Fabrica (disambiguation)
Fabrication (disambiguation), including Fabricate and Fabricating
Fabrice